Ožujsko (fully ; lit. It is the flagship brand produced by Zagrebačka pivovara, the biggest brewery in the country which is a part of Molson Coors Brewing Company since 2013.

Specification
It is made from natural ingredients – barley, yeast, hops and water. Ožujsko has a golden color. It was named after the month of March, when traditionally the best beer is made. With developments in production this seasonality is no longer important for the quality of Ožujsko pivo and now it can be brewed all year round. It is also described as "a golden lager, with a deep white head. A sweet corn and malt nose gives to a fruity finish"

History
Ožujsko beer is one of the oldest brands with uninterrupted continuity of production in Croatia. It was first produced in 1892.

Sales and sponsors
Ožujsko is the leading beer brand in terms of sales in Croatia, with a market share of approximately 40%. For the last 15 years, Ožujsko is the official sponsor of the Croatian national football team.

References

Croatian brands
Beer in Croatia
Molson Coors brands
Products introduced in 1892